Gandahati waterfall is located on the Mahendratanaya River in the Gajapati District, in Southern Odisha, India.
Gandahati waterfall is about 30 km from Paralakhemundi. The nearest railway station is Paralakhemundi and Palasa is 44 km from Parlakhemundi.

ABOUT GANDAHATI WATERFALLS 
Gandahati waterfall is a tourist place of Gajapati District of Odisha, which has been attracting a large number of visitors during winter. This waterfall is 153 km far from Berhampur and 30 km far from Paralakhemundi. This place can be reached via road or by train. The nearest railway stations are Palasa and Paralakhemundi. The way to the falls is covered with dense forest. You need to cross small villages on the way to the falls. After going 7 km form Paralakhemundi, you find a huge University campus which is called Centurion University. It is for engineering and allied sectors. Those who visit through this area can also gave a glance at this campus.

Santoshi Maa temple near Gandahati waterfalls. 
This waterfall is famous for the glittering water fall that has a consistent water flow throughout the year. Its scenic beauty amidst forest cover has attracting visitors from all the nearby areas. One Hindu Goddess Santoshi Maa temple lies to the left of the waterfall.

A wooden bridge is over the stream to cross the path. Additionally, there is a wooden fence that runs from the turning point where we enter the waterfall area to the steps that lead to the waterfall itself. A piece of garden is maintained for the amusement of the visitors with small benches and other swing and see-saw kind of things for children to play.

The stream is not so deep either, so that everyone despite their age can easily get into the water and play there. Huge rocks are one another viewpoint in this place where people can sit and enjoy the fall and take photographs.

External links
 https://www.gandahatiwaterfall.in/

References

Waterfalls of Odisha
Gajapati district